Maryland Route 302 (MD 302) is a state highway in the U.S. state of Maryland.  Known for most of its length as Barclay Road, the state highway runs  from U.S. Route 301 (US 301) near Barclay east to the Delaware state line near Templeville, where the highway continues northeast as Delaware Route 11 (DE 11).  MD 302 follows the Queen Anne's–Caroline county line for part of its length near Templeville.  The county line road is considered to be in Caroline County for maintenance purposes.  MD 302 was first paved in Barclay in the early 1920s and from Templeville to the state line in the late 1920s.  The gap between Barclay and Templeville was filled in the late 1930s.  MD 302 was extended west toward Church Hill in the late 1940s and to US 301 in the mid-1960s.

Route description

MD 302 begins at an intersection with US 301 (Blue Star Memorial Highway) about midway between Church Hill and Barclay in Queen Anne's County. County-maintained Hall Road heads west from the intersection toward Church Hill, and a park and ride lot is located in the northeast quadrant of the intersection. MD 302 heads east as two-lane undivided Barclay Road, which crosses Red Lion Branch near its source west of Stevens Corners. The highway passes through the town of Barclay as Church Street. In the center of town, the highway has a grade crossing with the Centreville Branch of the Northern Line of the Maryland and Delaware Railroad just west of the route's junction with MD 313 (Goldsboro Road). Upon leaving Barclay, the route becomes Barclay Road again. MD 302 crosses Unicorn Branch at its source, and the highway begins to follow the Queen Anne's–Caroline county line at its intersection with Woodyard Road. MD 302 passes through the town of Templeville, where the highway intersects the northern terminus of MD 454 (Crown Stone Road). East of the town, shortly after crossing Beaver Dam Ditch, MD 302 reaches its eastern terminus at the Delaware state line.  The highway continues northeast as DE 11 (Arthursville Road) toward the town of Hartly.

History
A second, unconnected section was completed between Templeville and the Delaware state line in 1930. The gap between Barclay and Templeville was filled in 1939. MD 302 was extended west about  toward Church Hill in 1949. The state highway reached its present length when it was extended to US 301 in 1966.

Junction list
MD 302 follows the Queen Anne's–Caroline county line from just west of Woodyard Road near Templeville to the Delaware state line.  The county line portion is considered to be in Caroline County for maintenance purposes.

See also

References

External links

MDRoads: MD 302
MD 302 at AARoads.com

302
Maryland Route 302
Maryland Route 302